Sharpsburg  (also Sharpsburgh) is an unincorporated community in Christian County, Illinois, United States. It is the birthplace of Native American scholar John Neihardt, author of Black Elk Speaks and many other works.

References

Unincorporated communities in Christian County, Illinois
Unincorporated communities in Illinois